Leila Roosevelt (1906–1976) was an American-born producer, director and screenwriter.

Early life 
1906 Roosevelt was born. Roosevelt's father was André Roosevelt, a French-born American filmmaker.

Filmography 
 1938 Magie africaine - Writer, Producer.
 1944 Dangerous Journey - Producer, Director.

Personal life 
Roosevelt was married to Armand Denis, a Belgium-born filmmaker. They had 4 children, Rene, David, Armand, and Heidi Ann.

References

External links
 
  as part of Denis Roosevelt

1906 births
1976 deaths
American directors
American film producers
20th-century American screenwriters